MOF-5 or IRMOF-1 is a cubic Metal–organic framework compound with the formula Zn4O(BDC)3, where BDC2−=1,4-benzodicarboxylate (MOF-5). It was discovered by Omar M. Yaghi. MOF-5 is notable for exhibiting one of the highest surface area to volume ratios among metal–organic frameworks, at 2200 m2/cm3. Additionally, it was the first metal–organic framework studied for hydrogen gas storage.

References

Zinc complexes
Metal-organic frameworks